The 2001 Legg Mason Tennis Classic was a men's tennis tournament played on outdoor hard courts at the William H.G. FitzGerald Tennis Center in Washington, D.C. in the United States and was part of the International Series Gold of the 2001 ATP Tour. The tournament ran from August 13 through August 19, 2001. Ninth-seeded Andy Roddick won the singles title.

Finals

Singles

 Andy Roddick defeated  Sjeng Schalken 6–2, 6–3
 It was Roddick's 3rd singles title of the year and of his career.

Doubles

 Martin Damm /  David Prinosil defeated  Bob Bryan /  Mike Bryan 7–6(7–5), 6–3
 It was Damm's 1st title of the year and the 19th of his career. It was Prinosil's only title of the year and the 12th of his career.

References

External links
 Official website 
 ATP tournament profile

Legg Mason Tennis Classic
Washington Open (tennis)
2001 in sports in Washington, D.C.